Computer Power and Human Reason: From Judgment to Calculation (1976) by Joseph Weizenbaum displays the author's ambivalence towards computer technology and lays out the case that while artificial intelligence may be possible, we should never allow computers to make important decisions because computers will always lack human qualities such as compassion and wisdom.

Weizenbaum makes the crucial distinction between deciding and choosing. Deciding is a computational activity, something that can ultimately be programmed. It is the capacity to choose that ultimately makes one a human being. Choice, however, is the product of judgment, not calculation. Comprehensive human judgment is able to include non-mathematical factors such as emotions. Judgment can compare apples and oranges, and can do so without quantifying each fruit type and then reductively quantifying each to factors necessary for mathematical comparison.

The book caused disagreement with, and separation from other members of the artificial intelligence research community, a status the author later said he'd come to take pride in.

See also
 Ethics of artificial intelligence
 Critique of technology

References

External links
 Review of Computer Power and Human Reason
 Excerpt from Computer Power and Human Reason
 Documentary Film on Joseph Weizenbaum, his life, his book and his humor Weizenbaum. Rebel at Work. (25C3 Video Recording)
 Plug & Pray, Documentary Film on Joseph Weizenbaum and the ethics of technology

Sociology books
Technology books
Philosophy of artificial intelligence
1976 non-fiction books